Carry On is a 1927 British silent drama film directed by Dinah Shurey and starring Moore Marriott, Trilby Clark and Alf Goddard.

Production
Carry On! deals with British military experiences in the First World War. For the production, Shurey borrowed warships from the Royal Navy.

In November 1927, The Brisbane Courier described the picture as “a British propaganda film”.

Cast
 Moore Marriott as Mick Trevorn 
 Trilby Clark as Sylvia 
 Alf Goddard as Lumley 
 Johnny Butt as Barker 
 Mickey Brantford as Mick – as a Child 
 Aggie Brantford as Molly – as a Child 
 Cynthia Murtagh as Molly 
 C. M. Hallard as John Peters 
 Patrick Aherne as Bob Halliday 
 Lewis Shaw as Bob – as a Child 
 Frank Atherley as Admiral Hallliday 
 Griffith Humphreys as Mr. Freeman 
 Wyndham Guise as Oliver Trevorn 
 Leal Douglas as Mrs. Trevorn 
 Wally Patch as Andrews

References

Bibliography
 Low, Rachael. History of the British Film, 1918–1929. George Allen & Unwin, 1971.
 Wood, Linda. ''British Films 1927–1939. British Film Institute, 1986.

External links

1927 films
1927 drama films
British drama films
Films directed by Dinah Shurey
British silent feature films
Seafaring films
Films shot at Lime Grove Studios
British black-and-white films
1920s English-language films
1920s British films
Silent drama films
Silent adventure films